At the 1908 Summer Olympics, two gymnastics events for men were contested. No nation was successful in winning more than one medal. No women's competitions were held, though women did participate in non-competitive gymnastic displays.

Medal summary

Participating nations
A total of 327 gymnasts from 14 nations competed at the London Games:

Medal table

References

Sources

 
 

 
1908
1908 Summer Olympics events
International gymnastics competitions hosted by the United Kingdom
1908 in gymnastics